(Realm of the Black Swan), Op. 7, is an opera in German in three acts composed by Siegfried Wagner in 1910 to his own libretto. It premiered on 5 November 1918 in Karlsruhe at the court theatre .

History 

Siegfried Wagner, the son of Richard Wagner, composed several operas on fairy tale and legendary topics. He completed the first act of Schwarzschwanenreich on 13 April 1909 in Santa Margherita Ligure, worked on the second act in November 1909 in Bayreuth and finished the opera with the third act on 10 April 1910 in Santa Margherita. The background of the action is provided by witch trials during the Thirty Years' War. As many women in Bohemia were burned as witches, the heroine Hulda, afraid of the Inquisition, has killed her illegitimate child and buried it in the forest. When the scene opens she is in the forest and sings of her regret and the dream of a friend whose understanding could free her from the burden of remorse.

Roles 

The action takes place in Bohemia in the 17th century.

Performances 

The opera was premiered at the Großherzogliches Hoftheater Karlsruhe on 5 November 1918, on the occasion of the birthday of the Großherzogin (Grand duchess) ("Zur Feier des Geburtsfestes Ihrer Königlichen Hoheit Der Großherzogin", conducted by Fritz Cortolezis and staged by Peter Dumas.

It was revived in a concert performance at the Theater der Stadt Solingen in Solingen on 12 June 1983. Bernhard Lang conducted the Städtisches Orchester Solingen, with Carmen Reppel as Hulda and Raffaele Polani as Liebhold.

References

External links 
 Siegfried Wagner, Op. 7: Schwarzschwanenreich (1910) 
 Recording, AllMusic
 Die Oper Schwarzschwanenreich von Siegfried Wagner / Werkanalyse Beck 
 Der Komponist Siegfried Wagner - Der Gralshüter von Bayreuth als Komponist von Märchenopern treatise 

Operas by Siegfried Wagner
1910 operas
German-language operas
Operas